Wandt v. Hearst's Chicago American,129 Wis. 419, 109 NW 70 (1906), was a Wisconsin Supreme Court case wherein the court ruled that a photographic association could be construed as defamation or libel.

The Chicago American ran a picture next to an article about a person who repeatedly attempted suicide. Although it wasn't explicit that the picture was of that person, the location of the picture next to that article created a false association that constituted libel. This case is authority that: where a person's picture is taken by a photographer, there is a breach of an implied contract or relationship of trust when the photographer makes additional pictures and uses them for commercial purposes.

References

United States defamation case law
Wisconsin state case law
1906 in United States case law
1906 in Wisconsin
Hearst Communications
Suicide in the United States
United States lawsuits